Harry Messy (or Massey) played ice hockey for the Montreal Victorias of the AHAC in 1897. He was dressed for several games, and played one game, as an injury replacement at forward. In those days ice hockey players played the whole game. Substitutions could only be made if a player was injured during the game. Messy did not score any goals. He was a member of 1897 Stanley Cup Montreal Victorias Stanley Cup winning team, but was not included on the team picture.

References
 

Canadian ice hockey forwards
Montreal Victorias players
Stanley Cup champions
Year of birth missing
Year of death missing